Kevin Wade Juma (born July 30, 1962) is a former professional American football wide receiver in the National Football League. He attended Idaho and played with the Seattle Seahawks in 1987.

External links
Pro-Football Reference

1962 births
Living people
American football wide receivers
Idaho Vandals football players
Players of American football from Seattle
Seattle Seahawks players